Johann Sebastian Bach composed the church cantata  (Come, you sweet hour of death), 161, in Weimar for the 16th Sunday after Trinity, probably first performed on 27 September 1716.

He based it on the prescribed gospel reading about the young man from Nain. His text reflects on longing for death, seen as a transition to a life united with Jesus. The text includes as a closing chorale the fourth stanza of the hymn "" by Christoph Knoll.

The cantata in six movements opens with a sequence of alternating arias and recitatives leading to a chorus and a concluding chorale. The chorale tune, known as "", appears in the first movement, played by the organ, and musical motifs of the arias are derived from it, providing an overall formal unity to the composition. Bach scored the work for two vocal parts (alto and tenor), a four-part choir, and a Baroque chamber ensemble of recorders, strings and continuo. In the alto recitative (movement 4), accompanied by all instruments, Bach creates the images of sleep, of waking up, and of funeral bells, the latter in the recorders and pizzicato of the strings. Bach expanded the final measures of the recitative ("so schlage doch") to a full length aria for tenor (Ach, schlage doch bald, selge Stunde) in the cantata Christus, der ist mein Leben, BWV 95, which he composed in 1723 in Leipzig.

While the libretto was published in a collection in 1715, Bach probably did not perform it until 27 September 1716, due to a period of public mourning of six months in the Duchy of Weimar from August 1715. Bach revived the cantata when he was Thomaskantor in Leipzig, but not for his cantata cycles, which included three new works for the 16th Sunday after Trinity. He performed  with minor changes between 1737 and 1746. He also assigned it to the occasion of Purification, a feast with a similar topic.

Background 

Born in 1685, Bach established his reputation as an outstanding organist while in his teens. He moved to Weimar in 1708 to take up a position as court organist to the co-reigning dukes Wilhelm Ernst and Ernst August of Saxe-Weimar. He had already begun to compose cantatas at his previous posts at Arnstadt and Mühlhausen, and his reasons for moving included disappointment with the standard of singing at the churches where he had worked. He was appointed concertmaster of the Weimar court capelle on 2 March 1714. In that position, he assumed principal responsibility for composing new works. Specifically, he was tasked with providing cantatas for the Schlosskirche (palace church) on a monthly schedule, which would result in a complete annual cycle for the liturgical year within four years. While Bach had composed vocal music only for special occasions until his promotion, the chance to regularly compose and perform a new work resulted in a program into which Bach "threw himself wholeheartedly", as the Bach scholar Christoph Wolff notes.

Cantatas of 1716 
Fewer cantatas have survived from this period than from the years before; possibly some were lost, and possibly some proposed cantatas were never written, reflecting Bach's loss of interest.

From the start of the liturgical year on the first Sunday in Advent, Bach composed prolifically. He wrote works for three consecutive Sundays in Advent, prompted probably by the death of the Kapellmeister Johann Samuel Drese on 1 December 1716. When Bach's hope to become Drese's successor was not realized, he ceased to compose cantatas for the Weimar court.

These works were performed by Bach as concertmaster in 1716, according to Wolff and Alfred Dürr, an authority on Bach's cantatas:

Readings and text 
Bach wrote  for the 16th Sunday after Trinity. The prescribed readings for that Sunday were from the Epistle to the Ephesians, about the strengthening of faith in the congregation of Ephesus, and from the Gospel of Luke, about the raising from the dead of the young man from Nain. In Bach's time the story pointed at the resurrection of the dead, expressed in words of desire to die soon.

He included as the closing chorale the fourth stanza of the hymn "" (1611) by Christoph Knoll. Dürr summarizes that Franck wrote "a deeply felt, personal confession of longing for Jesus". The Bach scholar Richard D. P. Jones notes that the cantata is "one of the most richly inspired of all Bach's Weimar cantatas", and sees the text as a part of the inspiration, with its "mystical longing for union with Christ".

Performances 

Bach led the first performance, but its date has been debated. Dürr concluded initially (in the first edition of his book Die Kantaten von Johann Sebastian Bach of 1971) that the cantata was first performed on 6 October 1715, but this date fell in a period of public mourning in Weimar. In August 1715 the brother of Duke Ernst August died, only 18 years old, and the duke proclaimed six months of mourning in the Duchy of Weimar. Cantata performances were resumed sooner, with the 21st Sunday after Trinity on 10 November 1715. Now, the first performance of the work is generally accepted as the same occasion the following year, when the 16th Sunday after Trinity fell on 27 September 1716, by Wolff, the publisher Carus-Verlag, and Dürr in the revised and translated edition of 2006. Richard D. P. Jones notes in his book The Creative Development of Johann Sebastian Bach that "technical novelties" also suggest that the cantata was composed in 1716, according to a recent study.

In 1723, his first year as Thomaskantor in Leipzig, Bach composed a new cantata for the 16th Sunday after Trinity, . A year later he wrote a chorale cantata for his second cantata cycle, and for his third cantata cycle there he composed . He revived  in Leipzig, but only later, in a version dated sometime between 1737 and 1746, with minor changes to the scoring. He even performed it for a different liturgical occasion, the feast of the Purification of Mary on 2 February. The prescribed readings for the Purification included Simeon's canticle Nunc dimittis, which with its line "now lettest thou thy servant depart in peace" has a similar theme.

Music

Structure and scoring 

The cantata is structured in six movements: a series of alternating arias and recitatives leads to a chorus and a concluding chorale. As with several other cantatas based on words by Franck, it is scored for a small ensemble: alto soloist (A), tenor soloist (T), a four-part choir and a Baroque chamber ensemble of two recorders (Fl), two violins (Vl), viola (Va), organ (Org) and basso continuo (Bc). The title page reads simply: "Auf den sechzenden Sontag nach Trintatis" (For the sixteenth Sunday after Trinity). The duration is given as 19 minutes.

One structural element is the anticipation of the closing chorale in the first movement, where the chorale melody is used as a cantus firmus.

At the Leipzig performances of the cantata, the first verse of the chorale was probably sung by a soprano, instead of using an instrumental rendition of the chorale tune in the first aria. The cantata was transposed from C major to E-flat major at Leipzig, where the recorders may have been replaced by transverse flutes.

In the following table of the movements, the scoring and keys are given for the version performed in Weimar in 1716. The keys and time signatures are taken from Dürr, using the C symbol for common time (4/4). The instruments are shown separately for winds and strings, while the continuo, playing throughout, is not shown.

Movements 

A Phrygian chorale melody, well known as the melody of "", provides the musical theme of the cantata, appearing in movement one in both its original form and the alto line derived from it. The themes of the two other arias are taken from the same melody, providing formal unity. The same melody appears five times in chorales of Bach's St Matthew Passion.

1 
The opening aria for alto, "" ("Come, o sweet hour of death" or "Come, thou sweet hour of parting") is accompanied by the recorders. They move in the ritornello in parallel thirds and sixths. The organ serves not only as a bass instrument but supplies the chorale melody. In Weimar, Bach seems to have expected the congregation to know the words of the first stanza of Knoll's hymn.

  Herzlich tut mich verlangen
  Nach einem selgen End,
  Weil ich hie bin umfangen
  Mit Trübsal und Elend.
  Ich hab Lust abzuscheiden
  Von dieser bösen Welt,
  Sehn mich nach himml'schen Freuden,
  O Jesu, komm nur bald!
  I yearn from my heart
  for a peaceful end,
  since here I am surrounded
  by sorrow and wretchedness.
  I wish to depart
  from this evil world,
  I long for heavenly joys,
  O Jesus, come quickly!
</div>
Jones points out that the cantus firmus of the organ seems "objective", in contrast to the subjective "display of personal feeling" of the voice and the complexity of the other parts.

In a later performance in Leipzig, a soprano sang the stanza with the organ.

2 
Ich habe Lust, von dieser Welt zu scheiden" (I desire to pasture soon with Christ. I desire to depart from this world). Dürr notes that the development from secco to arioso is frequent in Bach's early cantatas, and is here especially motivated to highlight the biblical paraphrase.

3 
The aria for tenor, "" (My longing
is, to embrace my Savior), is the first movement with the strings, adding depth to the emotional expression. It returns to the hope for union with Jesus of the first movement, expressed in an agitated way, with syncopies for "longing" and flowing motifs for "embracing". The middle section is mostly accompanied by the continuo only, but at times interjected by the strings playing the "longing"-motifs.

4 
The alto recitative, "" (The end has already come), is accompanied by all instruments, creating images of sleep (in a downward movement, ending in long notes), awakening (in fast movement upwards), and funeral bells in the recorders and pizzicato of the strings. The musicologist Tadashi Isoyama notes: "In this movement the anticipation of death appears to be fulfilled, and the alto's declamation, welcoming death and the ringing of the funeral bells, is filled with a pathos amounting almost to obsession."

5 
The first choral movement 5,"" (If it is my God's will), is marked aria by Franck. Bach set it for four parts, using song-like homophony. Wolff compares the style to Thuringian motets of around 1700. The first part is not repeated da capo, in keeping with the last words "" (May this be my last word). While a textual da capo is impossible, Bach composed a musical da capo, giving the movement a structure of ABB'A'. Dürr notes that Arnold Schering "has drawn attention to the increasing rapture".

6 
The closing chorale, "" (The body, indeed, in the earth), is illuminated by a fifth part of the two recorders playing a lively counterpoint in unison.

  Der Leib zwar in der Erden
  Von Würmen wird verzehrt,
  Doch auferweckt soll werden,
  Durch Christum schön verklärt,
  Wird leuchten als die Sonne
  Und leben ohne Not
  In himml'scher Freud und Wonne.
  Was schadt mir denn der Tod?
  The body, indeed, in the earth
  will be consumed by worms,
  yet it shall be resurrected,
  beautifully transfigured through Christ,
  it will shine like the sun
  and live without grief
  in heavenly joy and delight.
  What harm can death do me then?
</div>

The "soaring descant" of the recorders has been interpreted as "creating the image of the flesh transfigured".

Summary 
Wolff summarizes: "Cantata 161 is one of the most delicate and jewel-like products of Bach's years in Weimar. The writing in up to ten parts is extraordinarily subtle. ... The recorders additionally contribute in no small way to the spiritualised emotion and positive feelings associated with the 'sweet hour of death. Jones writes: "Bach's arrival at full maturity by about the middle of his Weimar period (1713–17) is attested by the stylistic and technical assurance, and the consistently high standard, of his writing at that time." He counts the cantata as one of several that reached a level of mastery unsurpassed in later years, along with the Orgelbüchlein and the cantata Ich hatte viel Bekümmernis, BWV 21, among others.

Publication 
The cantata was edited by Franz Wüllner for the Bach Gesellschaft Ausgabe, the first complete edition of Bach's works, in a volume published in 1887. The New Bach Edition (Neue Bach-Ausgabe, NBA) published the score of both the Weimar and the Leipzig version in 1982, edited by Helmuth Osthoff, with the critical commentary following in 1984.

Later performances 
John Eliot Gardiner performed the cantata twice in the Bach year 2000 as part of the Bach Cantata Pilgrimage with the Monteverdi Choir. One performance was on the anniversary of Bach's death, 28 July, at Iona Abbey, and the other on the 16th Sunday after Trinity (8 October) at the church of the Convent of San Domingos de Bonaval in Santiago de Compostela.

Recordings 
The table entries are excerpted from the selection on the Bach-Cantatas website. Choirs with one voice per part (OVPP) and ensembles playing on period instruments in historically informed performances are marked by green background.

References

Bibliography 
General
 
 
 

Books
 
 
 
 

Online sources

The complete recordings of Bach's cantatas are accompanied by liner notes from musicians and musicologists; Gardiner commented on his Bach Cantata Pilgrimage, Isoyama wrote for Masaaki Suzuki, and Wolff for Ton Koopman.

External links 
 
 
 
 
 Luke Dahn: BWV 161.6 bach-chorales.com

Church cantatas by Johann Sebastian Bach
1710s in music